Hugo Nicolson is an English record producer and engineer, who has worked on records for artists including Primal Scream, Embrace, David Holmes, Shack, Julian Cope, and his sister, Claire Nicolson (musician) who also performs under the pseudonym 'Tiger Onezie'. Nicolson started working as a tape op at the Townhouse Studios and progressed to being an engineer and producer on a number of well-known albums. Nicolson played a key role on Primal Scream's Screamadelica album, working with Andrew Weatherall as co-producer and engineer, helping to remix the original recordings made by the band.

Discography
 1988 My Nation Underground - Julian Cope
 1989 Trust - Brother Beyond
 1989 Skellington - Julian Cope
 1991 Screamadelica - Primal Scream
 1991 Peggy Suicide - Julian Cope
 1992 Jehovahkill - Julian Cope
 1993 Debut - Björk
 1999 Super Highways - The Other Two
 2000 Drawn from Memory - Embrace
 2000 XTRMNTR - Primal Scream
 2007 In Rainbows - Radiohead
 2012 Fear Fun - Father John Misty
 2016 Tween - Wye Oak
 2019 Lost Transmissions - Katharine O'Brien

References

English record producers
Year of birth missing (living people)
Living people